Les Whitfield (8 November 1907 – 6 November 1987) was an Australian rules footballer who played with Essendon in the Victorian Football League (VFL).

Notes

External links 
		

1907 births
1987 deaths
Australian rules footballers from New South Wales
Essendon Football Club players